"Sweet Thing" is a song performed by American funk and R&B band Rufus with vocals by band member Chaka Khan. As a single, it peaked number five on the Billboard Hot 100 chart in 1976. Mary J. Blige recorded her version, which charted in the United States and New Zealand in 1993.

Rufus featuring Chaka Khan version
Initially recorded and released a single in late 1975, it was first a hit with Rufus featuring Chaka Khan when they recorded the song in 1975, eventually reaching number-one on the R&B singles chart and number five on the pop chart. The song was co-written by Khan and Rufus bandmate Tony Maiden and became one of the band and Khan's signature songs. The record appears on the band's fourth album Rufus featuring Chaka Khan (1975). Khan re-recorded it for the 1998 soundtrack New York Undercover: A Night at Natalie's.

In 2009, Essence magazine included the song in their list of the "25 Best Slow Jams of All Time".

Track listing
"Sweet Thing"
"Circles"

Charts

Mary J. Blige version

In 1992, American singer Mary J. Blige recorded a rendition for her debut album What's the 411? (1992). It became Blige's third top 40 on the US Billboard Hot 100, reaching number 28. In addition, it marked Blige's first entry on the New Zealand Singles Chart. Blige also performed the song live on the eighteenth season of Saturday Night Live on March 13, 1993.

Critical reception
Daryl McIntosh from Albumism stated that Blige's "savory rendition" of the Rufus song "helped provide depth to her groundbreaking album". Stanton Swihart from AllMusic described it as "gospel-thrusted", stating that songs like "Sweet Thing" "are and will remain timeless slices of soul even after their trendiness has worn off". Larry Flick from Billboard said that the singer's version is "a faithful rendition of the Chaka Khan & Rufus classic. A shoulder-swaying rhythm base firmly supports an appealing, diva-style vocal and familiar funk guitar chords." He added, "Watch this one glide onto pop and urban playlists within seconds." The Daily Vault's Mark Millan noted that "Sweet Thing" "is probably the most "pop" of all the songs on offer here. It's another love song and Blige softens her tone a little to keep everything sweet." Havelock Nelson from Entertainment Weekly called it "a jazzy remake".

Credits and personnel
Credits adapted from the What's the 411? liner notes.

 Sean "Puffy" Combs – executive producer
 Charlie Davis – executive producer
 Mark Morales – producer
 Mark C. Rooney – producer
 Kurt Woodley – executive producer

Track listing

US cassette/7" vinyl single
 "Sweet Thing" – 3:44
 "Slow Down" – 4:30

US CD promo
 "Sweet Thing" (live) – 3:45
 "Sweet Thing" (album version) – 3:44
 "Sweet Thing" (TV) – 4:45

US 12" vinyl promo

Side one
 "Sweet Thing" (live version) – 3:45
 "Sweet Thing" (album version) – 3:44

Side two
 "Sweet Thing" (Daddy Hip Hop) – 5:05
 "Sweet Thing" (Daddy Hip Hop TV) – 4:45

Charts

Weekly charts

Year-end charts

Other cover versions
In 1997, contemporary jazz saxophonist Boney James did another remake of the song; it was included on the album titled Sweet Thing. The album's title track included background vocals by original co-writer Tony Maiden. UK soul singer Beverley Knight has also recorded a version of the song. Knight's version was recorded for a BBC Radio 2 session and was included as the B-side to her 2004 single "Not Too Late for Love". Due to the popularity of Knight's version with her fans, it was later included on her Voice - The Best of Beverley Knight (2006) compilation. Knight has since been invited to perform the song at Khan's London O2 Arena date on her UK tour, after collaborating with the singer on her Blige duet "Disrespectful" at the Montreux Jazz Festival. Filipina pop/RnB singer Nina also performed her own version of this song, which served as the opening track of her 2005 mega hit album Nina Live, which was recorded live and eventually received a diamond certification for selling over 1 million copies in the Philippines

References

1975 singles
1976 singles
1993 singles
Chaka Khan songs
Mary J. Blige songs
Songs written by Chaka Khan
1975 songs
ABC Records singles
MCA Records singles
Rhythm and blues ballads
Soul ballads
1970s ballads